Kokorina is a village in Istočni Mostar municipality, Republika Srpska, Bosnia and Herzegovina.

References

Populated places in Istočni Mostar